Castrillo Mota de Judíos is a municipality located in the province of Burgos, Castile and León, Spain. The 2004 census (INE) indicated the municipality had a population of 71 inhabitants.

Geography
It is crossed by the roads BU-400 and BU-403.

History

Name
The town was originally named Castrillo Motajudíos ("Jew hill camp") in 1035 when Jews fleeing from a nearby pogrom settled there; it was changed to Castrillo Matajudíos ("Jew-killer camp") in 1627 during a period of religious persecution of non-Christians in Spain (the Jews had been expelled from Spain in 1492 during the Spanish Inquisition). In June 2015 the name was changed back to Castrillo Mota de Judíos following a campaign led by mayor Lorenzo Rodríguez leading to a vote among the villagers in May 2014.

There have been several anti-Jewish incidents since the name change.

Personalities
 Antonio de Cabezón (1510–1566) – Composer and organist

Twin towns

Castrillo Mota de Judíos is twinned with:
 Kfar Vradim, Israel

See also

 Saint James the Moor-slayer, or Santiago Matamoros, the subject of the Way of St. James legend in Northern Spain
 La Mort aux Juifs, French town whose name translates to "Death to Jews"

References

External links

 Castrillo Mota de Judíos official website

Municipalities in the Province of Burgos